Burridge is an English surname. It is similar to Burrage.

List of People with the surname 

 Alan Burridge (born 1936), English cricketer
 Bill Burridge, English actor (active 1961–’73), known for Fury from the Deep
 Brian Burridge (born 1949), English Royal Air Force commander
 Donella Burridge (born 1958), Australian Olympic swimmer
 Geoffrey Burridge (1948–1987), English actor
 George A. Burridge (1883–1969), Canadian teacher and politician
 Jay Burridge (born 1971), English artist and television presenter
 John Burridge (born 1951), English footballer
 Kate Burridge (contemporary), Australian linguist
 Keith Burridge (born 1950), British molecular biologist
 Kenelm Burridge (born 1922), English anthropologist
 Lee Burridge (born 1968), English DJ
 Pam Burridge (born 1965), Australian surfer
 Peter Burridge (born 1933), English footballer
 Randy Burridge, (born 1966), Canadian ice-hockey player
 Richard Burridge (born 1951), English screenwriter
 Richard Burridge (priest) (born 1955), British theologian
 T. E. Burridge (1881–1965), British footballer
 Dan Burridge (born 1975), English footballer

See also 

 Burridge, Hampshire

Surnames
English toponymic surnames
English-language surnames
Surnames of English origin
Surnames of British Isles origin